The sixth series of the British television drama series Waterloo Road began broadcasting on 1 September 2010, and ended on 6 April 2011 on BBC One. The series follows the lives of the faculty and pupils of the Eponymous school, a failing inner-city comprehensive school. It consists of twenty episodes, divided into two half series of ten episodes each. The sixth series achieved an average of 5.11 million viewers in the ratings.

Plot
The show follows the lives of the teachers and the pupils at the eponymous school of Waterloo Road, a failing inner-city comprehensive, tackling a wide range of issues often seen as taboo such as a missing student, adultery, bulimia nervosa, bullying, contraception, an affair between a teacher and a pupil, child pornography, homelessness, young carers, a dog attack, Alzheimer's disease, postpartum psychosis, sexual exploitation, homosexuality, xenophobia and infertility.

Cast and characters

Staff
 Amanda Burton as Karen Fisher; Headteacher (18 episodes)
 William Ash as Christopher Mead; Deputy Headteacher and Science teacher (18 episodes)
 Karen David as Francesca "Cesca" Montoya; Head of Spanish (20 episodes)
 Jason Done as Tom Clarkson; Head of English (20 episodes)
 Philip Martin Brown as Grantly Budgen; English teacher (19 episodes)
 Elizabeth Berrington as Ruby Fry; Head of Food Technology (18 episodes)
 Chelsee Healey as Janeece Bryant; School secretary (18 episodes)
 Wil Johnson as Marcus Kirby; Geography teacher (10 episodes)
 Sharlene Whyte as Adanna Lawal; Head of Pastoral Care (10 episodes)
 Ian Puleston-Davies as Charlie Fisher; Supply teacher and Karen's husband (9 episodes)

Pupils
 Ayesha Gwilt as Amy Porter (20 episodes)
 Darcy Isa as Lauren Andrews (20 episodes)
 Linzey Cocker as Jess Fisher (19 episodes)
 Ben-Ryan Davies as Ronan Burley (19 episodes)
 Lucien Laviscount as Jonah Kirby (19 episodes)
 Jack McMullen as Finn Sharkey (19 episodes)
 William Rush as Josh Stevenson (18 episodes)
 Rebecca Ryan as Vicki MacDonald (18 episodes)
 Ceallach Spellman as Harry Fisher (17 episodes)
 Reece Douglas as Denzil Kelly (14 episodes)
 Shannon Flynn as Emily James (14 episodes)
 Anna Jobarteh as Ruth Kirby (13 episodes)
 Tina O'Brien as Bex Fisher (11 episodes)
 Holly Kenny as Sambuca Kelly (10 episodes)
 George Sampson as Kyle Stack (10 episodes)
 Scott Haining as Nate Gurney (9 episodes)

Others

Recurring
 Ralph Ineson as John Fry; Ruby's husband (7 episodes)
 Ciarán Griffiths as Dylan Hodge; Bex's abusive ex-boyfriend (5 episodes)
 Lorraine Cheshire as Fleur Budgen; Grantly's wife (4 episodes)
 Susan Cookson as Maria Lucas; Charlie's mistress (3 episodes)
 Lizzie Roper as Jackie Stack; Kyle's mother (2 episodes)
 Luke Tittensor as Connor Lewis; Pupil (2 episodes)
 Denise Welch as Steph Haydock; Former French teacher (2 episodes)

Guest
 Qasim Akhtar as Wayne Bodley; Pupil (1 episode)
 Jodie Comer as Sarah Evans; Pupil (1 episode)
 Reece Dinsdale as Matthew Gurney; Nate's father (1 episode)
 Joe Duttine as John Adams; Chair of Governors (1 episode)
 Neil Fitzmaurice as Dave Dowling; Martin's father (1 episode)
 Kieran Hardcastle as Martin Dowling; Pupil (1 episode)
 Jo Hartley as Laura Taylor; Billie's mother (1 episode)
 Jennifer Hennessy as Claire Evans; Sarah's mother (1 episode)
 Kelli Hollis as Chantel; Vicki's roommate (1 episode)
 Radosław Kaim as Lukas Wisniewski; Caretaker (1 episode)
 Martin Kemp as Kevin Burley; Ronan's gangster father (1 episode)
 Will Mellor as Dan Hargrove; Manager of a modelling agency (1 episode)
 Emil Marwa as Han Nichols; Business entrepreneur (1 episode)
 Nadine Rose Mulkerrin as Billie Taylor; Pupil (1 episode)
 Wanda Opalinska as Susan; Manager of Fleur's care home (1 episode)
 Elaine Symons as Rose Kelly; Sambuca and Denzil's mother (1 episode)
 Kaye Wragg as Hannah Kirby; Marcus' ex-wife and Jonah and Ruth's mother (1 episode)

Episodes

{| class="wikitable plainrowheaders" width="100%"
|-
! style="background-color: #B6000F; color: #FFFFFF;" colspan="8"|Autumn Term
|-
! style="background-color: #B6000F; color: #FFFFFF;" | No.
! style="background-color: #B6000F; color: #FFFFFF;" | Title
! style="background-color: #B6000F; color: #FFFFFF;" | Directed by
! style="background-color: #B6000F; color: #FFFFFF;" | Written by
! style="background-color: #B6000F; color: #FFFFFF;" | Original air date
! style="background-color: #B6000F; color: #FFFFFF;" | UK viewers(million)
|-

|-
! style="background-color: #B6000F; color: #FFFFFF;" colspan="8"|Spring Term
|-

|}

DVD release
Three different box sets of the sixth series was released. The first ten episodes of the series were released on 7 February 2011, and the back ten episodes were released on 20 June 2011. All twenty episodes were later released together on 16 January 2012. They were released with a "15" British Board of Film Classification (BBFC) certificate (meaning it is unsuitable for viewing by those under the age of 15 years).

References

2010 British television seasons
2011 British television seasons
Waterloo Road (TV series)